Leon Seals, Jr. (born January 30, 1964) is a former American football defensive end in the National Football League (NFL).  

Seals played college football at Jackson State University in Jackson, Mississippi, earning the nickname "Dr. Sack", and joined the Buffalo Bills after the 1987 NFL Draft as a fourth round draft choice (number 109 overall). He played with the Buffalo Bills from 1987 until 1991.  He started at defensive end in Super Bowl XXV and XXVI. He retired after the 1992 season with the Philadelphia Eagles.

Seals currently lives in Clinton, Mississippi. He has served as a member of the Hinds County Sheriff's Department.

References

American football defensive ends
Jackson State Tigers football players
Buffalo Bills players
Philadelphia Eagles players
1964 births
Living people